John Morgan (born 28 April 1953) is a former Australian rules footballer who played with Melbourne in the Victorian Football League (VFL).

Notes

External links 

		
		

1953 births
Australian rules footballers from Victoria (Australia)
Melbourne Football Club players
Old Scotch Football Club players
Living people